This is a list of Portuguese television related events from 1969.

Events
24 February - Simone de Oliveira is selected to represent Portugal at the 1969 Eurovision Song Contest with her song "Desfolhada". She is selected to be the sixth Portuguese Eurovision entry during Festival da Canção held at Teatro São Luiz in Lisbon.

Debuts

Television shows

Ending this year

Births

Deaths

References